This is a list of squads picked for the 2009 ICC Women's World Twenty20 tournament, held in England in June 2009. Age given is at the start of the tournament.

Australia

England

India

New Zealand

Pakistan

South Africa

Sri Lanka

West Indies

References

External links
 ICC Women's World Twenty20 2009 squads from ESPNCricinfo

ICC Women's World Twenty20 squads
2009 ICC Women's World Twenty20